For Singles Only is a 1968 American comedy film directed by Arthur Dreifuss and starring John Saxon, Mary Ann Mobley, Lana Wood, Peter Mark Richman and Ann Elder.

Plot
Close friends Anne Carr (Mary Ann Mobley) and Helen Todd (Lana Wood) move into a singles complex where every tenant must be unmarried and under 30.

A couple of neighbors make a wager with bachelor playboy Bret Hendley (John Saxon) that he can't seduce Anne successfully. Bret is too much a gentleman to accept, but when Anne learns the money would pay for Bret's college education, she willingly goes along with a romance.

Mr. Parker (Milton Berle), the building's manager, throws an engagement party for Bret and Anne, then proceeds to evict them from the premises. While they work through their issues, Helen endures a traumatic experience, making her consider giving up men for good.

Cast
 John Saxon as Bret Hendley
 Mary Ann Mobley as Anne Carr
 Lana Wood as Helen Todd
 Mark Richman as Gerald Pryor (as Mark Richman)
 Ann Elder as Nydia Walker
 Chris Noel as Lily
 Marty Ingels as Archibald Baldwin
 Hortense Petra as Miss Jenks
 Charles Robinson III as Jim Allen
 Duke Hobbie as Bob Merrick 
 Walter Wanderley Trio as Themselves
 Talya Ferro as Self
 Cal Tjader Band as Themselves 
 The Lewis & Clarke Expedition as Themselves (as Lewis & Clark Expedition)
 Nitty Gritty Dirt Band as Themselves 
 Sunshine Company as Themselves (as The Sunshine Company)
 Milton Berle as Mr Parker

Production
Filming started 18 September 1967. It was a rare comedy role for John Saxon.

Critical reception
A contemporary review in The New York Times by film critic Vincent Canby described the film as "a mindless, witless romantic drama about the mindless, witless young people who live, swim and boogoloo all day in one of those southern California apartment houses restricted to chamois-skinned unmarrieds," adding that the movie "is really an impotent fantasy about the sex life of the young [...] only an elderly movie producer living in southern California could remain alive and yet be so dead to the meaning of the world around him." In her review for AllMovie, critic Sandra Brennan wrote that the film "is basically about the exploitation [of] two naive young women," one of whom "gains firsthand experience with gang rape and suicide."

See also
List of American films of 1968

References

External links 
 
 For Singles Only TCM
 
 

1968 films
American comedy films
1968 comedy films
Columbia Pictures films
Films directed by Arthur Dreifuss
1960s English-language films
1960s American films